Vicario Portillo Martínez (born 6 November 1960) is a Mexican politician affiliated with the PRD. As of 2013, he served as Deputy of the LXII Legislature of the Mexican Congress representing Guerrero.

References

1960 births
Living people
Politicians from Guerrero
Party of the Democratic Revolution politicians
21st-century Mexican politicians
Deputies of the LXII Legislature of Mexico
Members of the Chamber of Deputies (Mexico) for Guerrero